Sheykh Bazar may refer to:
 Sheykh Bazar, Chabahar
 Sheykh Bazar, Polan, Chabahar County